M132 may refer to:

 M-132 (Michigan highway)
 M132 Armored Flamethrower
 LOM M132, an aircraft engine
 M132, a variant of the M35 series 2½-ton 6×6 cargo truck